Joel ben Simeon, also known as Feibush Ashkenazi (died c.1492) was a 15th-century Jewish scribe and illuminator who worked in Germany and Northern Italy. He is best known for the manuscript today known as the Ashkenazi Haggadah.

Life
Joel ben Simeon was originally from either Cologne (where Jews were expelled in 1424) or Bonn. Around the middle of the century he moved to northern Italy, where he travelled between cities to work his trade. He died around 1492.

References

15th-century German Jews
Jewish scribes (soferim)
Artists from North Rhine-Westphalia
1490s deaths